Loop Creek, also known by the spelling Loup Creek, is a tributary of the Kanawha River,  long, in southern West Virginia in the United States.

Loop Creek flows for its entire length in western Fayette County.  It rises in the city of Oak Hill and flows initially west-northwestward through the unincorporated communities of Lick Fork, Wriston, Ingram Branch, and Hamilton; then northward through the unincorporated communities of Kincaid, Page, North Page, and Robson, to Deep Water, where it flows into the Kanawha River.

In addition to Loup Creek, the Geographic Names Information System lists "Loops Creek" as a historical variant name for the creek. Loop Creek was so named on account of its irregular, looping course, according to local history.

See also
List of rivers of West Virginia
Deepwater Railway

References 

Rivers of West Virginia
Rivers of Fayette County, West Virginia
Tributaries of the Kanawha River